Berny Jacques is an American attorney politician serving as a member of the Florida House of Representatives for the 59th district. He assumed office on November 8, 2022.

Education 
Jacques earned a Bachelor of Arts degree in political science and history from Washington Adventist University and a Juris Doctor from the Stetson University College of Law.

Career 
In 2008, Jacques was a legislative intern for Congressman Mario Díaz-Balart. From 2012 to 2016, he served as an assistant state attorney in the Office of the Sixth Judicial Circuit State Attorney. In 2016 and 2017, he was an associate at Berkowitz & Myer. Since 2017, Jacques has worked as the senior director of partnerships at Big Brothers Big Sisters of Tampa Bay. He was also a political analyst for Bay News 9.

References 

Living people
Republican Party members of the Florida House of Representatives
Stetson University College of Law alumni
Florida lawyers
21st-century American politicians
African-American state legislators in Florida
Year of birth missing (living people)